Wendela Gustafva Sparre af Rossvik (December 14, 1772 – May 7, 1855) was a Swedish textile artist. She was a member of the Royal Swedish Academy of Arts. She managed the Harg ironworks in Uppland between 1816 and 1827.

Life
Sparre was born at Långdunker manor in Hyltinge parish in Södermanland to the noble Gabriel Sparre af Rossvik, captain of the royal regiment of Prince Frederick Adolf of Sweden, and Maria Vendela Ulfsparre af Broxvik. On 15 October 1801, she married the nobleman and royal equerry Axel Oxenstierna (1743-1816), with whom she had a son, Carl Gabriel Oxenstierna (1802-1873). 

After her marriage Sparre spent the majority of her life on her husband's estate, the Hargs ironworks in Uppland. She nursed her son, who was in poor health during his childhood. When she was widowed in 1816, she managed the Harg ironworks until the maturity of her son (that is, in 1827, when her son reached the age of 25 and thus reached his majority). 

Wendela Gustafva Sparre was known and acknowledged as a non-professional artist within silk embroidery. In 1797, she participated in the art exhibition of the academy with a work depicting a "Landscape of the South". The same year, she was elected to the Swedish Royal Academy of Arts. 
Her best known work is Flodlandskap ('Riverside') from 1796.

References 
  	Anteckningar om svenska qvinnor
 Dahlberg och Hagström: Svenskt konstlexikon. Allhems Förlag (1953) Malmö.
 http://arenabok.se/wordpress/wp-content/uploads/2013/03/utdr_HargII.pdf

Further reading
 

1772 births
1855 deaths
Members of the Royal Swedish Academy of Arts
18th-century Swedish artists
18th-century Swedish nobility
18th-century Swedish women artists
19th-century Swedish artists
18th-century women textile artists
18th-century textile artists
19th-century women textile artists
19th-century textile artists
19th-century Swedish businesspeople
Swedish ironmasters
Swedish embroiderers
19th-century Swedish businesswomen
19th-century ironmasters